Santosh Juvekar is an Indian  film, television and stage actor. Known for his work in Marathi films. He has also acted in Hindi films.

Career
Juvekar started with his acting career in 2004 with the Marathi play Aani Makarand Rajadhyaksha playing the role Naren Deshmukh. Directed by Dilip Kolhatkar, the play had Vikram Gokhale in it. He soon started working in various television serials and became popular with the show Ya Gojirvanya Gharaat. His first film debut was through Rajiv Patil's film Blind Game in 2006. The film had a notable star cast of Anant Jog and Upendra Limaye in lead roles and actress Mukta Barve in a small role. He later played various roles as the main lead in films like Zenda, Morya, Matter and more. He also did a movie named 31December:The Mirror in which he played the role of Army officer. He got nominated for Gadbad Gondhal in Ambarnath Marathi Film Festival in 2017 as Best Actor.

He also works in web series known as Struggler Saala which is available on YouTube.

Filmography

References

External links
 
 Deshmukh, Gayatri. I prefer home cooked food: Santosh Juvekar. Times of India,  14 December 2012, Retrieved 2 April 2013.

Indian male film actors
Male actors in Marathi cinema
Living people
Male actors in Marathi theatre
Male actors in Marathi television
Year of birth missing (living people)